Johann Sebastian Bach composed the church cantata  (Were God not with us at this time), 14, in Leipzig in 1735 for the fourth Sunday after Epiphany and first performed it on 30 January 1735, a few weeks after his Christmas Oratorio. The cantata, in Bach's chorale cantata format, is based on Martin Luther's hymn "Wär Gott nicht mit uns diese Zeit". Its text paraphrases Psalm 124, focussing on the thought that the believers' life depends on God's help and is lost without it.

Bach composed the cantata as a late addition to his chorale cantata cycle of 1724/25. In 1725, Easter had been early and therefore no fourth Sunday after Epiphany happened. The text was possibly prepared already at that time. Ten years later, Bach wrote an advanced unusual chorale fantasia as the first section of it, combining elements of a motet with complex counterpoint. The hymn tune is played by instruments, freeing the soprano to interact with the lower voices. In the inner movements, sung by three soloists, Bach depicts in word painting terms such as flood, waves and fury. The closing chorale resembles in complexity the chorales of his Christmas Oratorio.

History and words 

Bach held the position of Thomaskantor (director of church music) in Leipzig from 1723. During his first year, beginning with the first Sunday after Trinity, he had written a first cycle of cantatas for the occasions of the liturgical year. In his second year he composed a second annual cycle of cantatas, which was planned to consist exclusively of chorale cantatas, each based on one Lutheran chorale. As Easter was early in 1725, there was no Fourth Sunday after Epiphany that year. In 1735, shortly after the first performance of his Christmas Oratorio, Bach seems to have desired to fill this void and complete his cycle of chorale cantatas.

The prescribed readings for the fourth Sunday after Epiphany were taken from the Epistle to the Romans, "love completes the law", and from the Gospel of Matthew, Jesus calming the storm. The Neu Leipziger Gesangbuch, which was the standard hymnal in Leipzig since the late 17th century, specifies Luther's "Wär Gott nicht mit uns diese Zeit" as one of five hymns for the occasion. The cantata text is based on this hymn in three stanzas, a paraphrase of Psalm 124, published in Johann Walter's hymnal  of 1524. According to John Eliot Gardiner, this hymn "apparently, had been sung on this Sunday in Leipzig from time immemorial".

In Bach's typical format of the chorale cantata cycle, the text of the outer stanzas is retained unchanged, while an unknown librettist paraphrased the inner stanzas, in this case to three movements, two arias framing a recitative. According to Wolff, the librettist may have been Andreas Stübel, writing previously in 1724/25. The theme of the chorale is connected to the gospel in a general way: the believer's life depends on God's help and is lost without it. A connection is also provided by the image of flooding water that the psalm conveys, which begins "If it had not been the Lord who was on our side", and continues "then the waters had overwhelmed us, the stream had gone over our soul, then the proud waters had gone over our soul". The poet paraphrased it in the central recitative to "" ("Their fury would have, like a raging tide and like a foaming wave, flooded over us").

Bach first performed the cantata on 30 January 1735. It is one of his latest extant church cantatas. The only other extant Bach cantata for the fourth Sunday after Epiphany is his first cycle cantata BWV 81.

Music

Scoring and structure 
Bach structured the cantata in five movements. In the format typical for his chorale cantatas, the first and last movements are set for choir as a chorale fantasia and a closing chorale respectively. They frame a sequence of aria / recitative / aria which the librettist derived from the middle stanza of the hymn. Bach scored the work for three vocal soloists (soprano (S), tenor (T) and bass (B)), a four-part choir, and a Baroque instrumental ensemble: corno da caccia (Co), two oboes (Ob), two violins (Vl), viola (Va), and basso continuo (Bc).

In the following table of the movements, the scoring, keys and time signatures are taken from Alfred Dürr, using the symbol for common time (4/4). The instruments are shown separately for winds and strings, while the continuo, playing throughout, is not shown.

Movements

1 
The opening chorus, "" (Were God not with us at this time), is a chorale fantasia on the hymn tune. Luther's hymn is sung to the same melody as "" by Justus Jonas, which Bach had treated to a chorale cantata, . The opening chorus is an unusual composition that does not follow the scheme of instrumental ritornellos with a cantus firmus, sung line by line by the soprano in long notes. In a setting resembling a motet, the strings play colla parte with the voices, and each line of the chorale is prepared by a complex four-part counter-fugue, in which the first entrance of a theme is answered in its inversion. After preparing entrances, the chorale melody is not sung but played by the horn and the oboes in long notes, creating a five-part composition, which is unique in Bach's cantata movements.

2 
The first aria, "" (Our strength itself is too weak), is sung by the soprano, accompanied by the strings and the horn, which illustrates the text's "" (strong) and "" (weak) in combination with the voice. Gardiner notes that the horn supports the voice "in its highest register (referred to in the autograph part as Corne. par force and tromba)".

3 
The central recitative, "" (Yes, if God had only allowed it), is sung by the tenor as a secco recitative accompanied only by the continuo. The dangers of flooding waters are illustrated in fast passages of the continuo on words such as "" ("fury"), "" ("flood") and "" ("inundate"), making the movement almost an arioso.

4 
The bass aria, "" (God, under Your strong protection we are safe from our enemies.), is accompanied by the two oboes. The middle section shows similar word painting, picturing "" (waves) in octave leaps and fast downward scales.

5 
The closing chorale, "" (Praise and thanks to God, who did not permit that their maw might seize us.), is a four-part setting with "contrapuntally animated bass and middle voices", similar to the chorales of the Christmas Oratorio, first performed a few weeks before. Wolff summarizes the maturity of Bach's late church cantatas caused by "the experience accumulated by the composer between 1723 and 1729, which lends the later cantatas an especial ripe character".

Recordings 
Instrumental groups playing period instruments in historically informed performances are highlighted green under the header "".

References

Bibliography 
Scores
 
 

Books
 
 
 

Online sources

External links 

 Chapter 61 BWV 14 Wär Gott nicht mit uns diese Zeit / Were God not to be with us now. Julian Mincham, 2010
 Oregon Bach Festival Discovery Series / BWV 14 Wär Gott nicht mit uns diese Zeit Oregon Bach Festival 2003
 Luke Dahn: BWV 14.5 bach-chorales.com

Church cantatas by Johann Sebastian Bach
1735 compositions
Psalm-related compositions by Johann Sebastian Bach
Chorale cantatas